Notts, Lincs & Derbyshire 4 was a tier 13 English Rugby Union league with teams from Nottinghamshire, Lincolnshire and Derbyshire taking part. Promoted teams moved up to Notts, Lincs & Derbyshire 3 and since the cancellation of Notts, Lincs & Derbyshire 5 at the end of the 1991–92 season there was no relegation. Notts, Lincs & Derbyshire 4 was cancelled at the end of the 1995–96 campaign and the majority of teams transferred into Notts, Lincs & Derbyshire 3.

Original teams

When league rugby began in 1987 this division was divided into two regional divisions - east & west - containing the following teams:

Notts, Lincs & Derbyshire 4 East
Barton & District
Bourne
Cleethorpes
Harworth College 
Horncastle
Meden Valley
Ollerton
Rainworth
Yarborough

Notts, Lincs & Derbyshire 4 West
Ashbourne
Bolsover
Buxton
East Leake
Hope Valley
Leesbrook
Melbourne
Tupton
Whitwell

Notts, Lincs & Derbyshire 4 honours

Notts, Lincs & Derbyshire 4 East / West (1987–1990)

The original Notts, Lincs & Derbyshire 4 was divided into two tier 10 divisions - East and West. Promotion was to Notts, Lincs & Derbyshire 3 and there was no relegation until Notts, Lincs & Derbyshire 5 was introduced ahead of the 1990–91 season.

Notts, Lincs & Derbyshire 4 (1990–1992)

For the 1990–91 season Notts, Lincs & Derbyshire 4 was restructured became a single tier 10 league. Promotion continued to Notts, Lincs & Derbyshire 3 and relegation was now to the newly introduced Notts, Lincs & Derbyshire 5.

Notts, Lincs & Derbyshire 4 (1992–1993)

Restructuring of the Midlands leagues saw Notts, Lincs & Derbyshire 4 drop two levels to become a tier 12 league. Promotion continued to Notts, Lincs & Derbyshire 2 and the cancellation Notts, Lincs & Derbyshire 5 meant there was no longer relegation.

Notts, Lincs & Derbyshire 4 (1993–1996)

The top six teams from Midlands 1 and the top six from North 1 were combined to create National 5 North, meaning that Notts, Lincs & Derbyshire 4 dropped another level to become a tier 13 league. Promotion continued to Notts, Lincs & Derbyshire 3 and there was no relegation. At the end of the 1995–96 season the division was discontinued and the majority of clubs transferred to Notts, Lincs & Derbyshire 3.

Number of league titles

Cleethorpes (2)
Ashbourne (1)
Bakewell Mannerians (1)
Barton & District (1)
Bingham (1)
Bolsover (1)
Bourne (1)
Cotgrave (1)
East Leake (1)
Leesbrook (1)
Melbourne (1)

Notes

See also
Notts, Lincs & Derbyshire 1
Notts, Lincs & Derbyshire 2
Notts, Lincs & Derbyshire 3
Notts, Lincs & Derbyshire 5
Midlands RFU
Notts, Lincs & Derbyshire RFU
English rugby union system
Rugby union in England

References

External links
 NLD RFU website

Defunct rugby union leagues in England
Rugby union in Nottinghamshire
Rugby union in Derbyshire
Rugby union in Lincolnshire
Sports leagues established in 1987
Sports leagues disestablished in 1996